The 2009 ADAC Formel Masters season was the second season of the ADAC Formel Masters series from Germany. Daniel Abt became series champion, after winning eight of the season's sixteen races, and competed as a Volkswagen Junior driver in the German Formula Three Championship in 2010.

Teams and drivers
 All cars are powered by Volkswagen engines, and Dallara Formulino chassis.

Race calendar and results

Championship standings

Drivers'

Teams'

References

External links
 Official Website 
 ADAC Masters Weekend 

ADAC Formel Masters
ADAC Formel Masters seasons
ADAC Formel Masters